The Johnston United Soccer Association (JUSA) is a soccer league located in Johnston County, North Carolina. The league is home to many youth teams, from Recreational to Challenge, to Classic level teams in the eastern part of the Triangle area.

The league was founded as a not-for-profit organization and has grown in size ever since.

Johnston County, North Carolina